Nagornoye is a rural locality (a khutor) in Morozovskoye Rural Settlement, Rossoshansky District, Voronezh Oblast, Russia. The population was 137 as of 2010.

Geography 
Nagornoye is located 13 km south of Rossosh (the district's administrative centre) by road. Antselovich is the nearest rural locality.

References 

Rural localities in Rossoshansky District